The Cryptodonta are a nearly-extinct subclass of the bivalves. It contains a single extant order, Solemyida, while the Praecardiida are known only from fossils.

The valves of the shell are relatively thin and somewhat elongated. Unlike most other bivalves, species in this group have no hinge teeth on their shells. They have relatively primitive, "protobranchiate", gills.

Taxonomy

 Cryptodonta
 Order †Praecardiida
 Family †Butovicellidae
 Genus †Butovicella
 Family †Praecardiidae
 Genus †Slava
 Genus †Cardiola
 Family †Antipleuridae
 Genus †Dualina
 Genus †Hercynella
 Genus †Panenka
 Order Solemyida
 Superfamily Solemyidea
 Family Solemyidae (Awning clams)
 Genus Acharax
 Genus Solemya
 Family Manzanellidae 
 Genus Manzanella
 Genus Posterodonta
 Family Nucinellidae 
 Genus Huxleyia 
 Genus Nucinella

References

Bivalve taxonomy
Mollusc subclasses
Obsolete animal taxa